Rudy Bears is a former American professional mixed martial artist, who competed in the Welterweight division. A professional competitor since 2007, Bears has formerly competed for Bellator, Strikeforce, Titan Fighting Championships and M-1 Global.

Background
Bears is from Independence, Missouri and had a troubled upbringing, involving himself with street gangs and crime. He originally attended Van Horn High School but was caught trying to steal a car and as a result, was placed in jail for one month while looking at seven years in the penitentiary. It was during this time in jail, at the age of 17, that Bears decided to turn his life around. He wrote a heartfelt letter to the judge, who gave the young Bears a second chance. The judge released Bears on probation while in exchange Bears would have to finish high school and stay out of trouble, Bears then graduated from Truman High School and began practicing the martial arts.

Mixed martial arts career

International Sport Combat Federation
Before competing in professional mixed martial arts, Bears competed as an amateur in the International Combat Sport Federation, primarily as a Middleweight, and won three ICSF titles.

Early professional career
Bears made his professional debut against future Strikeforce veteran and current UFC Lightweight, Isaac Vallie-Flagg. Bears won the bout in the first round via rear-naked choke submission. Bears then compiled a record of 10-3 with one-fight stints in the Titan Fighting Championships and M-1 Global organizations, winning both by TKO. After the TKO win for M-1 Global, in a catchweight bout of 175 lbs. Bears was invited to compete in Strikeforce.

Strikeforce
Bears made his Strikeforce and Welterweight debut against then-undefeated future UFC veteran, Tyron Woodley in the main event, Strikeforce Challengers: Woodley vs. Bears on November 20, 2009. Bears lost the fight via arm-triangle choke submission and would not return to Strikeforce, as Bears then signed with the Bellator Fighting Championships.

Bellator
Bears made his Bellator debut at Bellator 16 against Brent Weedman and was knocked out in the first round, the first knockout loss of Bear's career. He then appeared three more times for the organization, going 2-1 in his next three fights with the loss being a rematch with Zak Cummings, who had defeated Bears early in his career.

Titan Fighting Championships
After his stint in Bellator, Bears signed with the Titan Fighting Championships and made his debut for the organization against former UFC Welterweight, Jason High. Bears lost the bout via technical submission 51 seconds into the fight after refusing to tap out due to a guillotine choke submission.

After bouncing back with a win via rear-naked choke submission, Bears has lost six of his last eight fights competing for both Bellator and Titan FC.

Shamrock Fighting Championships
Following a win over Zak Bucia, Bears defeated Josh Weston via rear-naked choke submission on January 17, 2015 at Shamrock FC: Shock to earn himself the promotion's vacant Welterweight title and a Bellator contract.

Return to Bellator
Bears faced Michael Page at Bellator 140 on July 17, 2015. He lost the fight via knockout in the first round.

Bears next faced Neiman Gracie at Bellator 163 on November 4, 2016. He lost the fight via submission in the first round.

Championships and accomplishments
Shamrock Fighting Championships
SFC Welterweight Championship (One time)

Mixed martial arts record

|-
| Loss
| align=center| 16–15
| Neiman Gracie
| Submission (armbar)
| Bellator 163
| 
| align=center|1
| align=center|4:39
| Uncasville, Connecticut, United States
| 
|-
| Loss
| align=center| 16–14
| Michael Page
| KO (punch)
| Bellator 140
| 
| align=center| 1
| align=center| 1:05
| Uncasville, Connecticut, United States
| 
|-
| Win
| align=center| 16–13
| Josh Weston
| Submission (rear-naked choke)
| Shamrock FC: Shock
| 
| align=center| 2
| align=center| 1:40
| Kansas City, Missouri, United States
| 
|-
| Win
| align=center| 15–13
| Zak Bucia
| Decision (unanimous)
| Shamrock Promotions: Impact
| 
| align=center| 3
| align=center| 5:00
| Kansas City, Missouri, United States
| 
|-
| Loss
| align=center| 14–13
| Ryan Jensen
| TKO (punches)
| Victory Fighting Championship 39
| 
| align=center| 1
| align=center| 1:01
| Ralston, Nebraska, United States
| 
|-
| Loss
| align=center| 14–12
| Igor Fernandes
| Submission (anaconda choke)
| Show Fighting Enterprise 1
| 
| align=center| 1
| align=center| 2:51
| Quito, Ecuador
| 
|-
| Loss
| align=center| 14–11
| Paul Daley
| TKO (punches)
| Bellator 72
| 
| align=center| 1
| align=center| 2:45
| Tampa, Florida, United States
| 
|-
| Win
| align=center| 14–10
| Nick Nolte
| Submission (punches)
| Titan FC 22
| 
| align=center| 1
| align=center| 3:58
| Kansas City, Kansas, United States
| 
|-
| Loss
| align=center| 13–10
| Marcio Navarro
| Decision (split)
| Bellator 56
| 
| align=center| 3
| align=center| 5:00
| Kansas City, Kansas, United States
| 
|-
| Loss
| align=center| 13–9
| A.J. Matthews
| Decision (unanimous)
| Bellator 53
| 
| align=center| 3
| align=center| 5:00
| Miami, Oklahoma, United States
| 
|-
| Loss
| align=center| 13–8
| Forrest Petz
| TKO (punches)
| C3 Fights: Great Plains Sizzling Slamfest
| 
| align=center| 1
| align=center| 2:55
| Newkirk, Oklahoma, United States
| 
|-
| Win
| align=center| 13–7
| Darryl Cobb
| Submission (rear-naked choke)
| Titan FC 18
| 
| align=center| 1
| align=center| 3:30
| Kansas City, Kansas, United States
| 
|-
| Loss
| align=center| 12–7
| Jason High
| Technical Submission (guillotine choke)
| Titan FC 16
| 
| align=center| 1
| align=center| 0:51
| Kansas City, Kansas, United States
| 
|-
| Win
| align=center| 12–6
| Chad Reiner
| KO (punch)
| Bellator 32
| 
| align=center| 1
| align=center| 1:29
| Kansas City, Missouri, United States
| 
|-
| Loss
| align=center| 11–6
| Zak Cummings
| Submission (D'arce choke) 
| Bellator 26
| 
| align=center| 1
| align=center| 1:27
| Kansas City, Missouri, United States
| 
|-
| Win
| align=center| 11–5
| Brian Green
| Submission (rear-naked choke)
| Bellator 22
| 
| align=center| 1
| align=center| 3:29
| Kansas City, Missouri, United States
| 
|-
| Loss
| align=center| 10–5
| Brent Weedman
| KO (punches)
| Bellator 16
| 
| align=center| 1
| align=center| 4:19
| Kansas City, Missouri, United States
| 
|-
| Loss
| align=center| 10–4
| Tyron Woodley
| Submission (arm-triangle choke)
| Strikeforce Challengers: Woodley vs. Bears
| 
| align=center| 1
| align=center| 2:52
| Kansas City, Kansas, United States
| 
|-
| Win
| align=center| 10–3
| Brendan Seguin
| TKO (punches)
| M-1 Global: Breakthrough
| 
| align=center| 2
| align=center| 1:01
| Kansas City, Missouri, United States
| 
|-
| Win
| align=center| 9–3
| Ted Worthington
| Decision (unanimous)
| Extreme Fight Production
| 
| align=center| 3
| align=center| 5:00
| Kansas City, Missouri, United States
| 
|-
| Win
| align=center| 8–3
| Charles Jones
| TKO (punches)
| C3 Fights
| 
| align=center| 2
| align=center| 2:47
| Newkirk, Oklahoma, United States
| 
|-
| Win
| align=center| 7–3
| Dominic Brown
| TKO (punches)
| Titan FC 12
| 
| align=center| 2
| align=center| 1:39
| Kansas City, Missouri, United States
| 
|-
| Win
| align=center| 6–3
| Chris Easter
| KO (punch)
| Havic Prizefighting: Downtown Throwdown 2
| 
| align=center| 1
| align=center| 2:18
| Wichita, Kansas, United States
| 
|-
| Win
| align=center| 5–3
| Jake Short
| Decision (split)
| C3 Fights: Showdown 2
| 
| align=center| 3
| align=center| 5:00
| Cherokee, North Carolina, United States
| 
|-
| Loss
| align=center| 4–3
| Joey Gorczynski
| Submission (guillotine choke)
| Freestyle Cage Fighting 21
| 
| align=center| 1
| align=center| 0:54
| Tulsa, Oklahoma, United States
| 
|-
| Win
| align=center| 4–2
| Tom Jones
| Submission (rear-naked choke)
| Freestyle Cage Fighting 20
| 
| align=center| 1
| align=center| 1:33
| Shawnee, Oklahoma, United States
| 
|-
| Win
| align=center| 3–2
| Nate James
| Submission (rear naked choke)
| CCCF: Battle on the Border
| 
| align=center| 1
| align=center| 0:39
| Newkirk, Oklahoma, United States
| 
|-
| Loss
| align=center| 2–2
| Zak Cummings
| Submission (choke)
| FM: Productions
| 
| align=center| 3
| align=center| 2:08
| Rolla, Missouri, United States
| 
|-
| Win
| align=center| 2–1
| Ruben Escamilla
| Submission (triangle choke)
| CCCF: Contenders
| 
| align=center| 2
| align=center| 1:21
| Oklahoma City, Oklahoma, United States
| 
|-
| Loss
| align=center| 1–1
| Leonardo Pecanha
| Submission (armbar)
| Titan FC 9
| 
| align=center| 1
| align=center| 0:38
| Kansas City, Kansas, United States
| 
|-
| Win
| align=center| 1–0
| Isaac Vallie-Flagg
| Submission (rear-naked choke)
| FW 15: Rumble at Rt. 66 Casino
| 
| align=center| 1
| align=center| 4:00
| Albuquerque, New Mexico, United States
|

References

External links

American male mixed martial artists
Mixed martial artists from Missouri
Welterweight mixed martial artists
Mixed martial artists utilizing American Kenpo
Mixed martial artists utilizing judo
Mixed martial artists utilizing jujutsu
Mixed martial artists utilizing Brazilian jiu-jitsu
Living people
1979 births
Sportspeople from Kansas City, Missouri
People from Independence, Missouri
American jujutsuka
American practitioners of Brazilian jiu-jitsu
People awarded a black belt in Brazilian jiu-jitsu